Josef Kjellgren, (13 November 1907 – 8 April 1948) was a Swedish writer and playwright.

Biography
Kjellgren was born and grew up on the island of  Mörkö in the Stockholm archipelago.   Later, his family moved to a residence near Hornstull on Södermalm in Stockholm. 

Kjellgren was a proletarian writer and a member of the influential modernist literary group Fem unga ('Five Young Ones') who published an anthology of the same name in 1929. 
Kjellgren's main theme was proletarian internationalism and solidarity within the working class. He published modernist proletarian poetry and books about his travels in Europe in the early 1930s, such as På snålskjuts genom Europa ('Across Europe Without a Penny in My Pocket', 1930). He was  a journalist and editor of the magazine Kulturfront from 1942-1944.

Kjellgren is best known for his later novels, including Människor kring en bro ('People Around a Bridge', 1935), about the building of Västerbron in Stockholm, and Smaragden ('The Emerald', 1939). Kjellgren   also wrote a play, Okänd svensk soldat ('Unknown Swedish Soldier', 1938), which was the basis for the 1948 movie Främmande hamn ('Foreign Harbour'), directed by Hampe Faustman.

Kjellgren died of tuberculosis in 1948 and was buried at Högalids kolumbarium in Stockholm.

References

20th-century Swedish dramatists and playwrights
Swedish male poets
Writers from Södermanland
20th-century deaths from tuberculosis
1907 births
1948 deaths
20th-century Swedish poets
20th-century Swedish male writers
Tuberculosis deaths in Sweden
Swedish male dramatists and playwrights